Jeremy Jay Freese (born March 15, 1971) is an American sociologist and author.

Work life 
Freese is a professor of sociology at Stanford University, where he is also the co-leader of the Health Disparities Working Group in the Stanford Center for Population Health Sciences. He previously served as professor of sociology at Northwestern University from 2007 to 2015, where he chaired the Department of Sociology from 2010 to 2013 and served as Ethel and John Lindgren Professor of Sociology from 2013 to 2015.

Video game design 
In 2008, he created the interactive fiction computer game Violet, which won the 2008 Interactive Fiction Competition and multiple awards.

Blogging 
He began blogging in 2003 because he was bored. In 2007, he was one of four sociologist bloggers profiled in the American Sociological Association's magazine Footnotes.

References

External links

Faculty page

Living people
1971 births
American sociologists
University of Iowa alumni
Indiana University alumni
Northwestern University faculty
Stanford University faculty
American male bloggers
American bloggers